The Sharadchandra Pawar Arts, Commerce and Science College Asurle-Porle, was founded in 2008 by N. D. Chougle, a former teacher in Kotoli, Kolhapur.

Located near Panhala Fort, northwest of Kolhapur, it hosts a senior college, residential school, Montessori training center and journalism department.

The school is affiliated to Shivaji University, Kolhapur.

Universities and colleges in Maharashtra
Kolhapur district
Shivaji University
Educational institutions established in 2008
2008 establishments in Maharashtra